Officine Universelle Buly 1803 is a French beauty brand, which was first founded by Jean-Vincent Bully in 1803 on rue Saint-Honore in Paris, and then dusted by the French couple, Ramdane Touhami and Victoire de Taillac-Touhami in 2014.
It is headquartered in Paris, France, and has had more than 25 stores around the globe and counting, known for its Parisian apothecary style, rich heritage, unique personalization, natural ingredients, and products collected and inspired from around the world.

The brand sells perfumes, scented candles, soaps, plant oils, and other beauty products for body, face and hair, as well as accessories.

History

Early years 
At the beginning of the 19th century, a merchant perfumer, Claude Bully, invented a vinaigre de toilette, a vinegar-based fragrance designed to fight body odors, cure disease, and nourish the skin, which later rewrote the perfume industry and popular beauty care, even it was first reserved for aristocrats.

Then his son, Jean-Vincent Bully, sought validation from doctors and scientists, bringing further recognition to the brand, while the vinegar was granted two patents in 1809, another for improvements in 1814, with products showcased at the 1823, 1827, and 1849 World Fairs, as well as at the Great Exhibition in London (in 1851). At its hype, Pêle-Mêle in 1904 claimed that “the best vinaigre de toilette … bears the name of Bully vinegar.”  Meantime in the summer of 1937, Le Figaro mentioned in its Beauty section: "Don't forget to buy a bottle of … Bully vinegar, the object of world renown for nearly a century."

After the high comes the low: Bully lost his shop due to a riot in the whirlwind of a revolution, and then had to sell his business "for a trifling sum", after which the perfumer died in poverty. His fate is mirrored in Cesar Birotteau, the eponymous protagonist in Balzac’s novel, Scenes from Histoire de la grandeur et de la décadence de César Birotteau from The Human Comedy.

The stores of Claude and Jean-Vincent Bully remained but a memory, yet a "Vinagre Aromatico Tipo de Bully" with the very same formula continued to exist in Latin America due to the vagaries of licensing; the work of the Bully family had endured, except outside the borders of France.

Creation of Officine Universelle Buly 1803 
Rediscovered by Ramdane Touhami and Victoire de Taillac-Touhami, the brand was revived to what is now known as Officine Universelle Buly, or Buly 1803 in short, an emporium of beauty secrets from all around the world.

The first Buly shop was established in 2014, at 6 rue Bonaparte, 75006, Paris, and has seen a fast expansion around the world ever since.
As of March 2021, Buly 1803 has 25 shops globally, in cities such as Paris, Hong Kong, New York, San Francisco, London, Tokyo, Kyoto, Seoul, Taipei, Osaka, etc.

Business structure 
Officine Universelle Buly was acquired by the multi-national LVMH in October 2021. The company is managed by the duo Ramdane Touhami, the manager, and Victoire de Taillac-Touhami, the head of communication and the spokesperson. The brand now operates in 7 countries in the world and is rapidly expanding.

Products 
Officine Universelle Buly carries a wide range of beauty products for body, face, hair and home, with more than 800 variants amassed from around the world. Most of them bear a traditional French name honoring its commitment to old beauty recipes but combined with innovative cosmetic techniques, such as eau triple, the brand’s water-based perfume, containing 0 alcohol.

Collaboration

The Louvre Museum 
2019 has seen an unprecedented collaboration between the Louvre museum and O.U.B, with 8 perfumers each selecting 8 art pieces as an inspiration for 8 new fragrances, namely:
 "The Valpinçon Bather" by Daniela Andrier
 "Winged Victory of Samothrace" by Aliénor Massenet
 “Nymph with a Scorpion” by Annick Ménardo
 “Joseph the Carpenter" by Sidonie Lancesseur
 "Venus de Milo" by Jean-Christophe Hérault
 "Grand Odalisque" by Domitille Michalon-Bertier;
 "The Lock" by Delphine Lebau； 
 "Conversation in a Park" by Dorothée Piot.

Some of the scents are also available in candles, postcards, as well as soap sheets.

References

External links 
 Official Website

Beauty stores
French brands
Luxury brands
Perfume houses
Skin care
LVMH brands